Christian the lion (12 August 1969 – ?)  was a lion born in captivity and purchased by Australian John Rendall and Anthony "Ace" Bourke from Harrods department store in London in 1969. He was later reintroduced to the African wild by conservationist George Adamson. One year after Adamson released Christian to the wild, his former owners decided to go looking for him to see whether Christian would remember them. He did, and with him were two lionesses who accepted the men as well.

Early years

Christian was born on 12 August 1969.

Christian was originally acquired by Harrods from the now-defunct zoo park in Ilfracombe. Rendall and Bourke purchased Christian for 250 guineas (£262.10s. in pre-decimal currency).

Rendall and Bourke,  along with their friends Jennifer Mary Taylor and Unity Jones, cared for the lion where they lived in London until he was a year old. As he got larger, the men moved Christian to their furniture store—coincidentally named Sophistocat—where living quarters in the basement were set aside for him. Rendall and Bourke obtained permission from a local minister to exercise Christian at the Moravian church graveyard just off the King's Road and Milman's Street, SW10; and the men also took the lion on day trips to the seaside.

Christian's growing size and the increasing cost of his care led Rendall and Bourke to understand they could not keep him in London. When Bill Travers and Virginia McKenna, stars of the film Born Free, visited Rendall and Bourke's furniture store and met Christian, they suggested that Bourke and Rendall ask the assistance of George Adamson. Adamson, a British conservationist and advocate for lions in Kenya, who together with his wife Joy raised and released Elsa the lioness, agreed to reintegrate Christian into the wild at their compound in the Kora National Reserve. Virginia McKenna wrote about the experience in her memoir The Life in My Years, published March 2009.

Adamson introduced Christian to an older male lion, "Boy", who had been used in the feature film Born Free and who also featured prominently in the documentary film The Lions Are Free, and subsequently to a female cub Katania in order to form the nucleus of a new pride. The pride suffered many setbacks: Katania was possibly devoured by crocodiles at a watering hole; another female was killed by wild lions; and Boy was severely injured, afterwards losing his ability to socialize with other lions and humans, and was shot by Adamson after fatally wounding an assistant. These events left Christian as the sole surviving member of the original pride.

Over the course of a year, as George Adamson continued his work, the pride established itself in the region around Kora, with Christian as the head of the pride started by Boy.

Reunions

1971
When John and Ace were informed by Adamson of Christian's successful reintroduction to the wild (reported in some newspaper articles to be in 1971, and by George Adamson to be 1972) they travelled to Kenya to visit Christian and were filmed in the documentary Christian, The Lion at World's End (released in the U.S. as Christian the Lion). According to the documentary, Adamson advised Rendall and Bourke that Christian might not remember them. The film shows the lion at first cautiously approach and then quickly leap playfully onto the two men, standing on his hind legs and wrapping his front legs around their shoulders, nuzzling their faces. The documentary also shows the lionesses, Mona and Lisa, and a foster cub named Supercub welcoming the two men.

1973
Rendall details a final, largely unfilmed reunion that occurred (reported in some newspaper articles to have been in 1974, and by George Adamson to have been in 1973). By this time Christian was successfully defending his own pride, had cubs of his own and was about twice the size he was in the earlier reunion video. Adamson advised Rendall that it would most likely be a wasted trip as he had not seen Christian's pride for nine months.  However, when he reached Kora, Christian and his pride had returned to Adamson's compound the day before their arrival.

George Adamson counted the days without seeing Christian from the late spring 1973 final reunion. He notes in his book My Pride And Joy (New York: Simon and Schuster, 1987) that after 97 days, he stopped counting.

Fate
Christian's final fate is unknown. Christian was last spotted headed towards Meru National Park after heading north and crossing the Tana River in 1973. As lions have average lifespans of 10 to 20 years, Christian has certainly passed. Rendall personally has hopes that Christian was able to fully integrate into the wild and live a full life as a wild lion, and has hopes that descendants of Christian continue to live on in present day Kenya.

In media

In 1971, Christian's owners published his story as A Lion Called Christian. This book was republished in 2009 following the spread of his story on YouTube.

A video of the 1971 reunion, edited from the documentary, was first posted on a fan web site in 2002. From there it was picked up by a MySpace user and then picked up from MySpace and posted on YouTube where it became a viral video and worldwide sensation, more than 30 years after the event. As of July 2009, several versions of the video have been viewed millions of times on YouTube, one garnering over 18 million. Various news sources have since tracked down Rendall and Bourke for their current perspective on the events surrounding their life with Christian.

In September 2008, Sony Pictures announced that it was interested in obtaining the rights to the story of Christian's life for the purpose of making a feature film.

A children's book about Christian was published in 2010.  Christian, the Hugging Lion was written by Justin Richardson and Peter Parnell, and illustrated by Amy June Bates. The book was nominated as a finalist for the 23rd Lambda Literary Awards in the Children's/Young Adult Fiction category.

Christian the lion also appeared on two Animal Planet shows, Untamed & Uncut and his own special A Lion Called Christian.

The official portrait of Christian the Lion, Uhuru, was drawn by hyperreal artist Emma Towers-Evans in 2021 in support of conservation charities.

References

External links
 Born Free Foundation website, with the uncut ending of the documentary reunion
 George Adamson Wildlife Preservation Trust
 Christian the Lion and his family....The Real Heroes
 A Lion Called Christian on Animal Planet
 Christian the Lion at Snopes.com
 BBC World Service (Interview of Burke and Rendell – 24 March 2009)
 Review @ WFMO
 The lion's tongue

Individual lions
Lions and humans
Harrods
1969 animal births